Françoise Madeleine d'Orléans (13 October 1648 – 14 January 1664) was born a Princess of France and was the Duchess of Savoy as the first wife of Charles Emmanuel II. She was a first cousin of Louis XIV as well of her husband. She was the shortest-serving Savoyard consort, dying at the age of fifteen, childless.

Biography

Orléans was born at the Château de Saint Germain en Laye outside Paris in 1648. She was the youngest surviving daughter of Gaston d'Orléans and his second wife Marguerite of Lorraine. From birth, she was styled Mademoiselle de Valois, derived from one of her father's subsidiary titles. She was the favourite sister of La Grande Mademoiselle, the famous heiress. She grew up in the company of her sisters and Mademoiselle de La Vallière, future mistress of Louis XIV. She resided at the Château de Blois. Her father died in 1660 and her mother remained unmarried.

As French court etiquette dictated, she held the status of a Granddaughter of France as a male line descendant of the late king Henry IV of France. She was styled as a petite-fille de France.

Under the influence of her paternal aunt Christine Marie, Dowager Duchess of Savoy, she was engaged to her first cousin Charles Emmanuel II, Duke of Savoy. Christine Marie had chosen her as she had wanted to maintain her power and influence in government having previously been regent for her son since 1637. The match was approved of by Cardinal Mazarin who had previously rejected Marie Jeanne of Savoy, another candidate for Charles Emmanuel II. Orléans proved suitably docile and was chosen over Marie Jeanne.

Orléans married the Duke of Savoy by proxy at the Palais du Louvre on 4 March 1663. The couple met for the first time at Annecy on 3 April 1663 where they were married officially. The couple travelled to Turin, capital of Savoy, where they arrived on 15 June 1663. She was known as Francesca Maddalena d'Orléans in her adopted Savoy.

The duchess soon died on 14 Jan 1664 at the Royal Palace of Turin, leaving her husband without an heir. She was buried at Turin Cathedral where she rests today. Her husband, inconsolable at her death, ordered a lavish funeral. After Orléans' death, Louis XIV tried to engage La Grande Mademoiselle to Charles Emmanuel II who refused the match. He later married again to Marie Jeanne of Savoy by whom he had a son.

Ancestors

Notes

Sources

|-

|-

|-

1648 births
1664 deaths
People from Saint-Germain-en-Laye
French royalty
French princesses
House of Orléans
Duchesses of Savoy
House of Bourbon-Montpensier
Princesses of France (Bourbon)
17th-century French people
Burials at Turin Cathedral